"Jungle Jive" is the twenty-second single by Dutch girl group Luv', released in 1991 by RCA Records/BMG. It appears on their	1991 album Sincerely Yours.

Song history
The second semester of 1990 saw changes to Luv's destiny. First of all, Michelle Gold was replaced by Carina Lemoine. Then, the trio had a new record company (RCA Records). Finally, after songs influenced by the Stock Aitken Waterman productions, the trio concentrated its efforts on a more eclectic music style (with elements of flamenco, Jazz, Rap, Dance, and Pop). Marga Scheide's partner, the producer Jacques Zwart (a.k.a. E.Mergency), was involved in Luv's new repertoire. He recruited famous session musicians in the Dutch music scene (like Bert Meulendijk, Eddie Conard, Hans Jansen, Lex Bolderdijk, Omar Dupree and Ton op 't Hof) for the recording of the group's new material.

The Spanish-themed song "Hasta Mañana" (1990) was the first single of the new Luv's formation to be released by RCA but failed to top the charts. The follow-up single, "Jungle Jive" (with its Exotica and Swing parts), composed by Scheide and Zwart, had the same fate and couldn't break into the hit lists. The release of this song coincided with the Gulf War, in which the Netherlands were part of the coalition against Iraq. Luv' performed in Dubai to support the Dutch troops involved in this conflict, following the examples of Marlene Dietrich, Marilyn Monroe, Raquel Welch or Kylie Minogue who had entertained soldiers.

1991 singles
1991 songs
Luv' songs
Songs written by Marga Scheide
RCA Records singles